Rurik (also spelled Rorik, Riurik or Ryurik; , from Old Norse Hrøríkʀ; ; died 879) was a semi-legendary Varangian chieftain of the Rus' who in the year 862 was invited to reign in Novgorod. According to the Primary Chronicle, Rurik was succeeded by his kinsman Oleg who was regent for his infant son Igor.
 
He is considered to be the founder of the Rurik dynasty, which went on to rule Kievan Rus' and its principalities, and ultimately the Tsardom of Russia, until the death of Feodor I in 1598. Vasili IV, who reigned until 1610, was the last Rurikid monarch of Russia.

Life 

Afterwards the tribes started fighting each other and decided to invite the Varangians, led by Rurik, to reestablish order. Rurik came along with his younger brothers Sineus and Truvor and a large retinue.

According to the chronicle, Rurik was one of the Rus', a Varangian tribe. Most historians believe that the Rus' were of Scandinavian origin. According to the prevalent theory, the name Rus is derived from an Old Norse term for "the men who row", from an older name for the Swedish coastal area of Roslagen.

Sineus established himself at Beloozero, and Truvor at the town of Izborsk. Truvor and Sineus died shortly after the establishment of their territories, and Rurik consolidated these lands into his own territory, extending his rule in northern Russia. Askold and Dir, followers of Rurik who were sent to Constantinople, seized Kiev before launching an attack, which is recorded in Byzantine sources for the year 860.

The Laurentian Codex of 1377, which contains the oldest surviving version of the Primary Chronicle, states that Rurik first settled in Novgorod ("newtown"), while the Hypatian Codex of the 1420s states that Rurik first settled in Ladoga, before moving his seat of power to the newly founded city of Novgorod, a fort built not far from the source of the Volkhov River, where he stayed until his death.

Rurik remained in power until his death in 879. On his deathbed, Rurik bequeathed his realm to Oleg, who belonged to his kin, and entrusted to Oleg's hands his son Igor, for he was very young. Oleg moved the capital to Kiev (by murdering the then-rulers and taking the city) and founded the state of Kievan Rus', which was ruled by Rurik's successors (his son Igor and Igor's descendants). The state persisted until the Mongol invasion in 1240.

Legacy

The Rurik dynasty (or Rurikids) went on to rule Kievan Rus', and ultimately the Tsardom of Russia, until 1598, and numerous noble families in the former lands of Kievan Rus' claim male-line descent from Rurik. The last Rurikid to rule Russia was Tsar Vasily IV (from the House of Shuysky, cadet branch of the House of Rurik), who reigned until 1610. The Romanovs were also related to descendants of Rurik. They were related to Rurik through marriage. The descendants of the princely families allegedly inherited from Rurik are still living.

As there are no remains of Rurik, the DNA of Rurik himself cannot be studied. The Y chromosomes of people thought to be the modern descendants of Rurik are often a subset of haplogroup N, traditionally called N1c and now known as N1a. Since then, the same N1c form has been found in other princely families descended from Rurik. These families are called Rurikids. However, not all the supposed descendants of Rurik have it.

Alternative theories

The name Rurik is a form of the Old Norse name Hrœrekr. Rorik of Dorestad was a member of one of two competing families reported by the Frankish chroniclers as having ruled the nascent Danish kingdom at Hedeby. He may have been a nephew of king Harald Klak. He is mentioned as receiving lands in Friesland from Emperor Louis I. He started to plunder neighbouring lands: he took Dorestad in 850, attacked Hedeby in 857, and looted Bremen in 859, while his own lands were ravaged in his absence. The Emperor was enraged and stripped him of all his possessions in 860. After that, Rorik disappears from western sources for a considerable period of time. In 862, according to the Russian sources, Rurik arrived in the eastern Baltic and built the fortress of Ladoga. Later he moved to Novgorod.

Rorik of Dorestad reappeared in Frankish chronicles in 870, when his Friesland demesne was returned to him by Charles the Bald. In 882 Rorik is mentioned as being dead (without a date of death specified). The Russian chronicle places the death of Rurik of Novgorod in 879, three years earlier than the Frankish chronicles. According to western sources, the ruler of Friesland was converted to Christianity by the Franks. This may have parallels with the Christianization of the Rus' reported by Patriarch Photius in 867.

The idea of identifying Rurik of Rus' with Rorik of Dorestad was revived by the anti-Normanists Boris Rybakov and Anatoly H. Kirpichnikov in the mid-20th century, but Alexander Nazarenko and other scholars have objected to it. The hypothesis of their identity currently lacks wide support among scholars, though support for a Viking/Norse rather than Slavic origin of Rus' has increased.

Notes

References

Further reading
 Bibliography of the history of the Early Slavs and Rus'
 Bibliography of Russian history (1223–1613)
 List of Slavic studies journals

External links 

Princes of Novgorod
Founding monarchs
9th-century princes in Kievan Rus'
830s births
870s deaths
Rurik dynasty
Varangians
9th-century rulers in Europe